Legion of Shadows is the eighteenth album by Nox Arcana, marking their 10-year anniversary. The album was announced as a dedication to their fans, and was one of two albums that Nox Arcana released in 2013 on Halloween — the second being Crimson Winter (Original Motion Picture Soundtrack), William Piotrowski's first solo project and score for the vampire film Crimson Winter.

In addition to the original compositions, Legion of Shadows includes Vargo's Gothic rendition of Bach's classical piece "Toccata and Fugue"

Track listing
All original music composed and performed by Joseph Vargo. "Toccata and Fugue in D minor" composed by Johann Sebastian Bach, with arrangement and additional instrumentation by Joseph Vargo.

 "We Are Legion" — 1:58
 "The Hidden Realm" — 2:07
 "Skeletons In The Closet" — 3:13
 "Shivers" — 2:40
 "Distant Memories" — 2:55
 "Ancient Flame" — 4:00
 "Loveless" — 3:11
 "Dreamscape" — 3:34
 "Evil Genius" — 3:34
 "Ghost In The Mirror" — 2:41
 "Toccata" — 4:56
 "Lorelei " — 2:34
 "Black Phoenix" — 3:33
 "Spirits Of The Past" — 3:02
 "On Dark Wings" — 3:10
 "Haunted Dreams" — 2:49
 "Into The Night" — 3:13
 "Rites Of Passage" — 4:26
 "Arise" — 2:07
 "Legion Of Shadows" — 2:50
 "Heart Of Darkness" — 5:51
 The song "Heart Of Darkness" ends at 4:10. An untitled hidden track begins at 4:25.

References

External links 
 Nox Arcana's official website
[ Legion of Shadows] at Allmusic
[ Crimson Winter] at Allmusic

Nox Arcana albums
2013 albums